Fraser-Hoyer House is a historic home located at West Haverstraw in Rockland County, New York.  It was built about 1812 and is a two-story, five bay, rectangular frame dwelling with a hipped roof and stone foundation.  It features Federal style details.

The house of William Smith had been built previously on this site in 1770.

It was listed on the National Register of Historic Places in 1976.

References

Houses on the National Register of Historic Places in New York (state)
Federal architecture in New York (state)
Houses in Rockland County, New York
National Register of Historic Places in Rockland County, New York